Franklinoceras is an extinct gensu of cephalopods from the nautiloid order, Discosorida. Nautiloids comprise a subclass of shelled cephalopods that were once diverse and numerous but are now represented by only a handful of species.

Franklinoceras is an early discosorid from the family Reudemannoceratidae, similar to the ancestral Reudemannoceras. Both are from the early Middle Ordovician; both have endogastric cyrtocones, except in Franklinoceras they are compressed so as to be higher than wide, rather than the other way around as in Reudemannoceras (Teichert, 1964).

See also

 Reudemannoceratidae for further discussion of Reudemannoceras and Franklinoceras
 Discosorida
 Nautiloidea
 List of nautiloids

References

 Teichert, C. (1964). Nautiloidea -Discosorida; Treatise on Invertebrate Paleontology Part K, Mollusca 3, R.C. Moore (ed) Univ. Kans. press.
 Sepkoski, J.J. Jr. (2002). "A compendium of fossil marine animal genera". Sepkoski's Online Genus Database (CEPHALOPODA)

Prehistoric nautiloid genera
Discosorida